WMGP (98.1 FM, "Magic 98.1") is a US rock-leaning classic hits  music-formatted radio station that plays hit music from the 1960s, 1970s, and 1980s. The station is licensed to Hogansville, Georgia, and serves the southwest tip of Atlanta and Midwest Georgia area. Since February 2002, it has used the branding "Midwest Georgia's Magic 98.1" and currently uses the branding "Magic 98.1". The station is owned by iHeartMedia, Inc. along with sister stations in Newnan, Georgia, and Atlanta.

History

The station went on  air as WEIZ on August 9, 1991. On September 20, 1995, its call sign was changed to WZLG; it became WISY on July 30, 1999, WMAX-FM on August 2, 1999 (using the branding "Mix 98.1"), and WMGP on February 28, 2002, (as "Magic 98.1").

References

External links

MGP
Radio stations established in 1991
1991 establishments in Georgia (U.S. state)
IHeartMedia radio stations